Line 5 of Ningbo Rail Transit is a rapid transit line in Ningbo. It starts from west Yinzhou District and ends in Xingzhuang Road Station in Zhenhai District. In the future extension plan, the line will extend and become a loop.

The construction of the first section started on 28 September 2016. The line uses GoA4 fully automated trains. The line opened on 28 December 2021.

Route 
Line 5 starts from Buzheng Station in western Yinzhou District as an underground line. Then it goes along Yinxian Road and passes the Fenghua River until it reaches Xiaying and turns north. Then the line goes along first Haiyan Road and then Yuanshi Road. Then the line passes the Yong River and reaches its destination, Xingzhuang Road Station.

Stations

Phase 1

References 

Rail Transit
Rail transport in Zhejiang
Railway lines opened in 2021
Automated guideway transit